Armando Vega (born October 24, 1935) is an American former gymnast. He competed in eight events at the 1956 Summer Olympics.

References

External links
 

1935 births
Living people
American male artistic gymnasts
Olympic gymnasts of the United States
Gymnasts at the 1956 Summer Olympics
People from Grant County, New Mexico
Penn State Nittany Lions men's gymnasts